Locality may refer to:
 Locality, a historical named location or place in Canada
 Locality (association), an association of community regeneration organizations in England
 Locality (linguistics)
 Locality (settlement)
 Suburbs and localities (Australia), in which a locality is a geographic subdivision in rural areas of Australia

Science 
 Locality (astronomy)
 Locality of reference, in computer science
 Locality (statistics) 
 Principle of locality, in physics

See also 
 Local (disambiguation)
 Type locality (disambiguation)